Sarcomphalus is a genus of plants in the family Rhamnaceae.

Species
The following species are recognised in the genus Sarcomphalus:

Sarcomphalus acutifolius 
Sarcomphalus amole 
Sarcomphalus bidens 
Sarcomphalus chloroxylon 
Sarcomphalus cinnamomum 
Sarcomphalus crenatus 
Sarcomphalus cyclocardius 
Sarcomphalus divaricatus 
Sarcomphalus domingensis 
Sarcomphalus glaziovii 
Sarcomphalus guatemalensis 
Sarcomphalus havanensis 
Sarcomphalus joazeiro 
Sarcomphalus laurinus 
Sarcomphalus lloydii 
Sarcomphalus mexicanus 
Sarcomphalus microdictyus 
Sarcomphalus mistol 
Sarcomphalus obovatus 
Sarcomphalus obtusifolius 
Sarcomphalus parvifolius 
Sarcomphalus pedunculatus 
Sarcomphalus piurensis 
Sarcomphalus platyphyllus 
Sarcomphalus reticulatus 
Sarcomphalus rhodoxylon 
Sarcomphalus saeri 
Sarcomphalus strychnifolius 
Sarcomphalus taylorii 
Sarcomphalus thyrsiflorus 
Sarcomphalus undulatus 
Sarcomphalus yucatanensis

References

 
Rhamnaceae genera
Flora of the Caribbean
Taxonomy articles created by Polbot